"Two Scavengers in a Truck, Two Beautiful People in a Mercedes" is a poem by American poet Lawrence Ferlinghetti. Up until 2010, the poem was studied by English school children as part of the GCSE AQA Anthology.

Description
The poem describes four people stuck at traffic lights in downtown San Francisco - two are garbage collectors and two are an elegant couple in a Mercedes. The poem is about the contrast between these people and the gap that is developing between the rich and poor even in the USA which is meant to be a 'democracy'.  The description of the couple as "Beautiful People" is perhaps ironic as the term was first used to describe those had held countercultural ideals during the 1960s. The poem questions whether America can be called a Russian scam  given the disparities in wealth between those, rich and poor.

References

External links
Web archive - BBC Bitesize page
Web Archive - A Slideshow of the poem (Flash must be enabled)

American poems
1980 poems
Works about social class